The following is a partial list of Recorded Texas Historic Landmarks (RTHLs) arranged by county as designated by the Texas Historical Commission and local county historical commissions in Texas. This page includes RTHLs in the following counties: Mason, Matagorda, Maverick, McCulloch, McLennan, McMullen, Medina, Menard, Midland, Milam, Mills, Mitchell, Montague, Montgomery, Moore, Morris, Motley, Nacogdoches, Navarro, Newton, Nolan, Nueces, Ochiltree, Oldham, Orange, Palo Pinto, Panola, Parker, Parmer, Pecos, Polk, Potter, Presidio, Rains, Randall, Reagan, Real, Red River, Reeves, Refugio, Roberts, Robertson, Rockwall, Runnels, and Rusk.

KEY

Landmarks with multiple historic designations are colored according to their highest designation within the following hierarchy.

Mason County

Matagorda County

Maverick County

McCulloch County

McLennan County

McMullen County

Medina County

Menard County

Midland County

Milam County

Mills County

Mitchell County

Montague County

Montgomery County

Moore County
There are currently no Recorded Texas Historic Landmarks listed within the county.

Morris County

Motley County

Nacogdoches County

Navarro County

Newton County

Nolan County

Nueces County

Ochiltree County

Oldham County

Orange County

Palo Pinto County

Panola County

Parker County

Parmer County

Pecos County

Polk County

Potter County

Presidio County

Rains County

Randall County

Reagan County

Real County

Red River County

Reeves County

Refugio County

Roberts County

Robertson County

Rockwall County

Runnels County

Rusk County

See also

References

External links

 (Mason-Rusk)
Landmarks (Mason-Rusk)